The 2012–13 Buffalo Bulls men's basketball team represented the University at Buffalo, The State University of New York during the 2012–13 NCAA Division I men's basketball season. The Bulls, led by 14th year head coach Reggie Witherspoon, played their home games at Alumni Arena and were members of the East Division of the Mid-American Conference. They finished the season 14–20, 7–9 in MAC play to finish in a tie for fourth place in the East Division. They advanced to the quarterfinals of the MAC tournament to Kent State.

Following the season,   coach Reggie Witherspoon was fired. He posted a record of 198–228 in 14 seasons.

Roster

Schedule

|-
!colspan=9| Regular season

|-
!colspan=9| 2013 MAC men's basketball tournament

References

Buffalo Bulls men's basketball seasons
Buffalo
Buffalo Bulls
Buffalo Bulls